Love Letter is a 2003 South Korean television series starring Jo Hyun-jae, Soo Ae and Ji Jin-hee. It aired on MBC from February 10 to April 1, 2003, on Mondays and Tuesdays at 21:55 for 16 episodes.

This drama revolves around Lee Woo-jin's conflict between priesthood and his love for childhood friend Eun-ha.

Overview

Act 1 - Growing up
As a young orphan, Lee Woo-jin (Andrew) received horrible treatment while growing up under his aunt. When his uncle comes back from Italy, his uncle a priest decides to raise him. Eun-ha, another orphan is brought to the cathedral as well. Although initially antagonistic to Woo-jin, the two becomes inseparable friends. At the end of high school, Eun-ha is about to confess her feelings for Andrew however Andrew tells her of his dreams to become a priest.

Act 2 - College
Andrew and Eun-ha leave the cathedral to attend college. Andrew meets Jung Woo-jin and the two become close friends. Jung Woo-jin falls in love with Eun-ha but she rebuffs his attentions. The love triangles causes hurt and pain for all 3 friends. It is brought to a climax where Andrew writes Eun-ha a love letter but Jung Woo-jin destroys the love letter without Eun-ha reading it.

Act 3 - Finale
Andrew returns from the seminary but has not taken his final vows of priesthood. Eun-ha develops a heart condition and before the final operation makes Andrew promise to fulfill his dreams to become a priest. After the operation Eun-ha slips into a coma. Jung Woo-jin is finally able to escape the love triangle and Andrew takes his vow to become a priest. Eun-ha awakens from the coma and Andrew agrees to take care of her.

Cast and characters

Main characters
Jo Hyun-jae as Lee Woo-jin (Andrew)
Lee Woo-jin was raised by a cruel aunt before being taken to live with his priest uncle. Although he believes his mother has died, it is later revealed that she abandoned him to become Jung Woo-jin's stepmother. Kind and introspective, he wrestles with his desire to become a priest with his feelings for Eun-ha. He studied medicine in university and is a trained surgeon.

Soo Ae as Cho Eun-ha
Another orphan taken into care at the seminary after the death of her mother. Although antagonistic at first to everyone, she slowly develops feelings for Lee Woo-jin. She is caught between affections from Jung Woo-jin and her own unrequited love for Lee Woo-jin. A life-threatening heart condition makes her ask Lee Woo-jin to choose priesthood over her. Although the surgery on her heart was a success she slips into a coma. She awakens from a coma at the end of the series ready to spend the rest of her life with Lee Woo-jin.

Ji Jin-hee as Jung Woo-jin
Although initially friendly to Lee Woo-jin, his jealously of the relationship of Eun-ha and Lee Woo-jin as well as the discovery that his stepmother is Woo-jin's biological mother causes him to act out of character and sabotage Lee Woo-jin's attempt at happiness. Like Lee Woo-jin he is also a qualified surgeon. He has unresolved issues with his father for leaving his biological mother and although he rebels against him, he finds himself turning out to be exactly like him.

Supporting characters
Son Hyun-joo as Father Peter
Father Peter is Lee Woo-jin's maternal uncle who raised him in the church after rescuing him from a cruel paternal aunt.

Kim Young-ae as Dr. Im Kyung-eun
Im Kyung-eun is Lee Woo-jin's biological mother who abandoned him at birth.

Kim Yoon-kyung as Seo-young 
Eun-ha's friend.

Kwon Min-joong as Sister Esther
Yoon Yoo-sun as Sister Gemma
Yang Hee-kyung as Maria
Father Peter's cook/housekeeper.

Joo Hyun as Dr. Jung Myung-woo
Im Kyung-eun's husband and Jung Woo-jin's father.

Choi Jae-hyung
Seo Hyun-ki
Son Young-joon 
Jung Woo-jin's friend

Jung Mi-ae as Andrew's high school classmate
Yoo Seung-ho as young Lee Woo-jin/Andrew
Han Ye-rin as Hee-jin
Lee Woo-jin's cousin.

International broadcast
It also aired on KBFD-TV in Hawaii in March 2003.

GMA 7, a leading Philippine TV network aired Love Letter in March 2004.

References

External links
 Love Letter official MBC website 
 
 
 Love Letter review at SPCNET

MBC TV television dramas
2003 South Korean television series debuts
2003 South Korean television series endings
Korean-language television shows
South Korean romance television series
South Korean melodrama television series